Brian Moore (born February 1, 1962) is a member of the Iowa House of Representatives first elected in 2010.

, Moore serves on several committees in the Iowa House – the Agriculture, Economic Growth, and Ways and Means committees, as well as the Transportation, Infrastructure and Capitals Appropriations budget subcommittee.  He serves as the Vice Chair of the Transportation committee.

Biography
Moore is a lifelong Jackson County resident.  He graduated from Maquoketa Community Schools and then attended college.  He is his associate degree in Ag Business from Kirkwood Community College.  After graduation, he returned to rural Jackson County to farm.

In 1983, Brian married Kim, a teacher at Marquette Catholic High School in Bellevue.  Together Brian and Kim have eight children and three grandsons.

He owns Elwood Feed & Livestock, a livestock transportation business.  He is also a member of the Jackson County Cattlemen's Association, the Farm Bureau, the Bellevue Marquette Booster Club, and the Optimist Chapter of the Eagles Club.

Electoral history
*incumbent

References

External links
 Brian Moore at Iowa Legislature
 Brian Moore at Iowa House Republicans website

1962 births
Republican Party members of the Iowa House of Representatives
Living people
21st-century American politicians